De Land is a village in Piatt County, Illinois, United States. The population was 446 at the 2010 census. The name of the village is spelled De Land by the census bureau. A few of the main shops are Casey's General Store, Barnyard Treasures and Auction house, DeLand Farmer's Grain Cooperative, and two antique shops.

History

DeLand was founded in 1873 by Thomas E. Bondurant. who had it laid out as an answer to the needs of the local farmers for a place from which to ship their grain.  Before officially being named DeLand, the town was known as "Tom's Town" in honor of Thomas Bondurant. The origination of the name DeLand has disputed sources, most tracing back to either James DeLand who helped bring the railroad to the area in 1872 or French DeLand a surveyor who is said to have laid out the town. The village was incorporated in 1899.

In 1912 a Carnegie Library was opened in DeLand with $8,000 provided by the Carnegie Corporation of New York, after a group of citizens including Tom McMillen, a local bank employee, and Lucy Thornton, the president of the Women's Club, raised public support for the project. The original library building was closed in 2009 and all books and materials were moved to a building nearby.

In 2002, the De Land board of trustees acknowledged that it had passed a sundown town ordinance decades earlier.

Geography

Demographics

As of the census of 2010, there were 446 people, 185 households, and 132 families residing in the village. There were 207 housing units of which 185 were occupied. The racial makeup of the village was 98.4% White, 1.1% Hispanic, 0.9% 2+ races, 0.4% Asian, and 0.2% Black.

There were 185 households, out of which 27.6% had children under the age of 18 living with them, 55.1% were married couples living together, 8.6% had a female householder with no husband present, 7.6% had a male householder with no wife present,  and 28.6% were non-families. 30.8% of all households had individuals under 18 years of age and 29.2% had individuals who were 65 years of age or older. The average household size was 2.41 and the average family size was 2.84.

In the village, the population was spread out, with 24.4% under the age of 20, 4.3% from 20 to 24, 26.7% from 25 to 44, 27.8% from 45 to 64, and 16.8% who were 65 years of age or older. The median age was 40.5 years. The median age for males was 39.8, and 41.7 for females.

The median income for a household in the village was $40,982, and the median income for a family was $45,156. Males had a median income of $31,429 versus $20,893 for females. The per capita income for the village was $17,377. About 4.9% of families and 4.6% of the population were below the poverty line, including 2.8% of those under age 18 and 9.5% of those age 65 or over.

Local high school
DeLand-Weldon High School is the school that serves both towns and the surrounding areas. It is the twentieth smallest high school, and fourth smallest public high school in the state, with a total enrollment of 54 students.

See also

References

External links

Villages in Piatt County, Illinois
Villages in Illinois
Piatt County, Illinois
Sundown towns in Illinois